Timothy Patrick Johnstone Dodd (born 21 April 1961) is a former English cricketer.  Dodd was a right-handed batsman who bowled right-arm medium-fast.  He was born at Hammersmith, London.

Dodd made his debut for Berkshire in the 1987 Minor Counties Championship against Oxfordshire.  From 1987 to 1992, he represented the county in 29 Minor Counties Championships matches.  In 1996, he made his final appearance for the county against Devon in the Minor Counties Championship.  He also represented Berkshire in 4 MCCA Knockout Trophy matches, the last of which came against Buckinghamshire in 1992.

Dodd also represented the county in 2 List-A matches, making his List-A debut against Yorkshire in the 1988 NatWest Trophy.  He represented the county in a further List-A match  against Sussex in the 1989 NatWest Trophy.  In his 2 List-A matches, he scored 19 runs at a batting average of 19.00, with high score of 15.  With the ball he took 2 wickets at a bowling average of 23.00, with best figures of 2/37.

References

External links
Timothy Dodd at Cricinfo
Timothy Dodd at CricketArchive

1961 births
Living people
People from Hammersmith
Cricketers from Greater London
English cricketers
Berkshire cricketers